Pandava is a genus of araneomorph spiders in the family Titanoecidae.

Taxonomy
In 1967, Pekka T. Lehtinen transferred the species Amaurobius laminatus, first described by Tamerlan Thorell in 1878, into his newly created genus Pandava as P. laminata, placing it in the family Titanoecidae. Over 30 years later, in 2001, a further species, Pandava hunanensis, was added to the genus. A major revision of Pandava in 2010 saw five new species being added.

Diagnosis
Male spiders placed in the genus Pandava differ from other species of Titanoecidae in features of the palpal bulb: the tegular process (a projection from the tegulum) is smaller; the median apophysis (one of the hardened plates making up the palpal bulb) is thumb-shaped. Females differ in features of the epigynum: the copulatory openings are more anterior.

Species
, the World Spider Catalog accepted eleven species:

Pandava andhraca (Patel & Reddy, 1990) – India
Pandava aruni Bodkhe, Uniyal, Kamble, Manthen, Santape & Chikhale, 2017 – India
Pandava banna  Lin & Li, 2022 – China
Pandava ganesha Almeida-Silva, Griswold & Brescovit, 2010 – India
Pandava ganga Almeida-Silva, Griswold & Brescovit, 2010 – India
Pandava hunanensis Yin & Bao, 2001 – China
Pandava kama Almeida-Silva, Griswold & Brescovit, 2010 – India
Pandava laminata (Thorell, 1878) (type species) – Tanzania, Kenya, Madagascar, India, Sri Lanka to China, Indonesia, Philippines, Micronesia, French Polynesia. Introduced to Britain, Netherlands, Germany, Poland, Hungary
Pandava nathabhaii (Patel & Patel, 1975) – India
Pandava sarasvati Almeida-Silva, Griswold & Brescovit, 2010 – Myanmar, Thailand
Pandava shiva Almeida-Silva, Griswold & Brescovit, 2010 – India, Pakistan

References

Titanoecidae
Araneomorphae genera
Spiders of Africa
Spiders of Asia
Taxa named by Pekka T. Lehtinen